Suntukan sa Ace Hardware was a Facebook  event that took place on April 15, 2016, at an Ace Hardware branch in SM City Lucena in Lucena, Quezon, supposedly for a free-for-all fistfighting match. Thousands of Filipino netizens responded "going" on the event's page, which attracted attention from local news sources and made the event into an Internet meme.

Background
The event was created as a shitpost by the Facebook page "Bulbulito Balagbag: tuberong kulay green", whose name is a crude Tagalog reference to pubic hair, some time in March 2016. More than 54,000 Facebook users said that they would go to the event, while around 36,000 expressed interest.

Response
On March 31, Ace Hardware Corporation denied any involvement in the event. Netizens mockingly expressed their "disappointment" over the advisory, saying that they cancelled prior commitments, such as weddings and even a childbirth, to attend the event.

Leigh Reyes, President and COO of MullenLowe Philippines, an advertising agency, criticized Ace Hardware's stern reaction to the tongue-in-cheek event, saying that disavowing any involvement and condemning those who organized the stunt is not an effective business strategy, but fame is. Reyes suggested using the ensuing publicity to their strategic advantage by offering discounts to actual attendees, for example.

On April 4 and 11, 2016, Ace Hardware posted a countdown and released a poster for the fictitious event on their official Facebook page. On April 15, the day of the scheduled brawl, Ace Hardware prepared a small mock boxing ring where customers could take photos. The date also coincidentally fell within a 3-day mallwide sale at SM City Lucena.

See also
Josh fight
Storm Area 51, They Can't Stop All of Us – a similar satirical Facebook event
International State College of the Philippines – a fictional university that went viral through a Facebook satire page

References

April 2016 events in the Philippines
2010s fads and trends
2016 in Internet culture
2016 in the Philippines
Facebook
Internet memes introduced in 2016
Satirical works
Internet memes introduced from the Philippines